Pangkhua (Pangkhu), or Paang, is a Kuki-Chin language primarily spoken in Bangladesh. Most speakers of Pangkhu are bilingual in Bengali, and most education in Pangkhu is conducted in that language.  

Since there is essentially no literature in Pangkhua, other than oral folk tales and songs, the Pangkhua community members use Lushai literature. There are minimal language differences between Pangkhua, Tlanglau, Falam Chin, Bawm and Mizo

Dialects
The dialects of the two main communities that use Pangkhu, Bilaichari and Konglak, share 88% of their basic vocabulary.

References

External links
Endangered Languages Profile for Panghku

Kuki-Chin languages